Ang'angxi is a county-level district of the city of Qiqihar in Heilongjiang province, China.

Administrative divisions

There are four subdistricts, one town, and one ethnic town in the district: 

Subdistricts:
Xinxing Subdistrict, Xinjian Subdistrict, Daobei Subdistrict, Linji Subdistrict

Towns:
Yushutun, Shuishiying Manchu Ethnic Town

References

External links

Districts of Qiqihar